HYB may refer to:

 Honeybourne railway station, in England
 Hyderabad Deccan railway station, in India